The Campbell River Storm are a Junior "B" ice hockey team based in Campbell River, British Columbia, Canada. They are members of the North Division of the Vancouver Island Junior Hockey League (VIJHL). The Storm play their home games at Rod Brind'Amour Arena. Jordan Rauser has been the coach since 2023.  They are captained by forward Davis Frank.

The Storm joined the league in 1997 as an expansion team. In its VIJHL history, the team has won the Cyclone Taylor Cup twice, in 1999 and 2015. The Storm have won the Brent Patterson Memorial Trophy ten times in 1998, 1999, 2000, 2001, 2002, 2003, 2004, 2015, 2017 and 2018. They won the Andy Hebenton Trophy seven times, as the team with the league's best regular season record in 1997, 1998, 2000, 2001, 2002, 2003 and 2018.

In 2015, the Storm became the only team in VIJHL history, to win the VIJHL Championship, The BC Provincial Championship and the Keystone Cup as Western Canada's Junior B champions, all in the same season.

History 
The Storm play in the VIJHL, a Junior B hockey league on Vancouver Island consisting of 9 teams.
The team began play in the 1997–98 season and went on to capture the Patterson Memorial Trophy as playoff champions in its first season.  They would win the trophy 6 more times in a row, then reach the finals the following 2 seasons, losing in six games to the Victoria Cougars in 2005, then again in 6 games to the Kerry Park Islanders in 2006.

They have played in 9 Cyclone Taylor Cup tournaments, winning it twice in 1999 and 2015 and silver in 2017. In 2004 they hosted it, losing to the Richmond Sockeyes of the Pacific International Junior Hockey League in the finals. In 2019, they will once again be the hosts of the Cyclone Taylor Cup.

Three times they have played in the Keystone Cup, capturing bronze in 1999 in Thunder Bay, Ontario, taking silver as hosts in 2006, and winning gold in 2015 in Cold Lake, Alberta.
They play out of the Strathcona Gardens Complex in Campbell River, in Rod Brind'Amour Arena.
They were previously owned and coached by Jim Revenberg, who was selected in the 7th round of the 1989 NHL Entry Draft by the Vancouver Canucks,. Current owners are Linda Lahtinen (2011–Present) and Sean Estabrook (2022–Present) .

Season-by-season record

Note: GP = Games played, W = Wins, L = Losses, T = Ties, OTL = Overtime Losses, Pts = Points, GF = Goals for, GA = Goals against

Cyclone Taylor Cup
British Columbia Jr B Provincial Championships

 - VIJHL Champs Victoria Cougars were Cyclone Cup hosts - Storm advanced as VIJHL representative

Keystone Cup
Western Canadian Jr. B Championships (Northern Ontario to British Columbia)
Six teams in round robin play. 1st vs 2nd for gold/silver & 3rd vs. 4th for bronze.

Notable alumni
Clayton Stoner (NHL)
Colin Blake (All Time Leading Scorer 327 points 2012 - 2017)

Awards and trophies  

Cyclone Taylor Cup
1998-99, 2014–15

Brent Patterson Memorial Trophy
1997-98, 1998–99, 1999–00, 2000–01, 2001–02, 2002–03, 2003–04, 2014–15, 2016–17

Andy Hebenton Trophy
1996-97, 1997–98, 1999–00, 2000–01, 2001–02, 2002–03, 2017–18

Grant Peart Memorial Trophy
2006-07

Doug Morton Trophy
Jason Jaques: 2002-03
David Arduin: 2003-04
Karl Hagg: 2008-09

Jamie Robertson Trophy
David Arduin: 2003-04

Larry Lamoureaux Trophy
Justin Birks: 1999-00

Ray's Sports Centre Trophy
David Klatt: 1996-97
Davis Parley: 1997-98
Erick Robertson: 1999-00
Ryan Riddle: 2000-01
Justin Foote: 2001-02
Kyle Blanleil: 2002-03
Chris Smith: 2016-17

Walt McWilliams Memorial Trophy
Brandon Gee: 1998-99
Jesse Bachmeier: 2008-09
Kobe Oishi: 2016-17

References

External links
Official website of the Campbell River Storm

Campbell River, British Columbia
Ice hockey teams in British Columbia
1997 establishments in British Columbia
Ice hockey clubs established in 1997